Ash railway station serves the village of Ash in Surrey, England. The station is served by South Western Railway, who manage the station, and by Great Western Railway.

History 
Ash station was opened by the Reading, Guildford and Reigate Railway, then operated by the South Eastern Railway. The London and South Western Railway had running powers over this section of line, to North Camp, but it had never used them. After the construction of the direct line from Pirbright Junction, the LSWR built a spur to Aldershot, part of the lines to Alton, enabling its trains to call at Ash station.

The South Eastern Railway became part of the Southern Railway during the Grouping of 1923. The station then passed on to the Southern Region of British Railways on nationalisation in 1948.

The station had four platforms when it was built, which were later reduced to two after the Second World War. The other two platforms were where the station car park and Network Rail offices now stand. To the east is the former Ash Junction,  from Charing Cross, where the former route via  left the North Downs Line  from Waterloo (via  and milepost  at ).

When Sectorisation was introduced in the 1980s, the station was served by Network SouthEast 
until the Privatisation of British Railways.

Services 

Regular train destinations are Reading, Redhill, Guildford, Gatwick Airport and Farnham.

Typical off-peak services from Ash Monday - Friday are:
 2 trains per hour to Guildford (South Western Railway)
 2 trains per hour to Farnham (South Western Railway)
 1 train per hour to Reading (Great Western Railway)
 1 train per hour to Redhill (Great Western Railway)

South Western Railway services between Guildford & Ascot are run using Class 450. The Reading to Redhill & Gatwick Airport service is operated by Class 165 or Class 166 Diesel Multiple Units.

Notes

References

 
 
 
 Station on navigable O.S. map

External links 

Railway stations in Surrey
DfT Category E stations
Former South Eastern Railway (UK) stations
Railway stations in Great Britain opened in 1849
Railway stations served by Great Western Railway
Railway stations served by South Western Railway
1849 establishments in England